Pochinok is the name of several inhabited localities in Russia.

Modern localities

Arkhangelsk Oblast
As of 2012, one rural locality in Arkhangelsk Oblast bears this name:
Pochinok, Arkhangelsk Oblast, a village in Zabelinsky Selsoviet of Kotlassky District

Bryansk Oblast
As of 2012, one rural locality in Bryansk Oblast bears this name:
Pochinok, Bryansk Oblast, a village in Titovsky Rural Administrative Okrug of Pochepsky District;

Ivanovo Oblast
As of 2012, four rural localities in Ivanovo Oblast bear this name:
Pochinok, Kineshemsky District, Ivanovo Oblast, a village in Kineshemsky District
Pochinok, Palekhsky District, Ivanovo Oblast, a village in Palekhsky District
Pochinok, Vichugsky District, Ivanovo Oblast, a village in Vichugsky District
Pochinok, Zavolzhsky District, Ivanovo Oblast, a village in Zavolzhsky District

Kaluga Oblast
As of 2012, one rural locality in Kaluga Oblast bears this name:
Pochinok, Kaluga Oblast, a village in Kuybyshevsky District

Kirov Oblast
As of 2012, one rural locality in Kirov Oblast bears this name:
Pochinok, Kirov Oblast, a village in Kalachigovsky Rural Okrug of Verkhoshizhemsky District;

Kostroma Oblast
As of 2012, thirteen rural localities in Kostroma Oblast bear this name:
Pochinok, Antropovsky District, Kostroma Oblast, a village in Palkinskoye Settlement of Antropovsky District; 
Pochinok, Galichsky District, Kostroma Oblast, a village in Dmitriyevskoye Settlement of Galichsky District; 
Pochinok, Chernyshevskoye Settlement, Kadyysky District, Kostroma Oblast, a village in Chernyshevskoye Settlement of Kadyysky District
Pochinok, Yekaterinkinskoye Settlement, Kadyysky District, Kostroma Oblast, a village in Yekaterinkinskoye Settlement of Kadyysky District
Pochinok, Kologrivsky District, Kostroma Oblast, a village in Sukhoverkhovskoye Settlement of Kologrivsky District; 
Pochinok, Makaryevsky District, Kostroma Oblast, a village in Ust-Neyskoye Settlement of Makaryevsky District; 
Pochinok, Manturovsky District, Kostroma Oblast, a village in Podvigalikhinskoye Settlement of Manturovsky District; 
Pochinok, Mikhalevskoye Settlement, Neysky District, Kostroma Oblast, a village in Mikhalevskoye Settlement of Neysky District
Pochinok, Soltanovskoye Settlement, Neysky District, Kostroma Oblast, a village in Soltanovskoye Settlement of Neysky District
Pochinok, Ostrovsky District, Kostroma Oblast, a village in Alexandrovskoye Settlement of Ostrovsky District; 
Pochinok, Sharyinsky District, Kostroma Oblast, a village in Zabolotskoye Settlement of Sharyinsky District; 
Pochinok, Soligalichsky District, Kostroma Oblast, a village in Soligalichskoye Settlement of Soligalichsky District; 
Pochinok, Susaninsky District, Kostroma Oblast, a village in Severnoye Settlement of Susaninsky District;

Leningrad Oblast
As of 2012, one rural locality in Leningrad Oblast bears this name:
Pochinok, Leningrad Oblast, a settlement in Larionovskoye Settlement Municipal Formation of Priozersky District;

Mari El Republic
As of 2012, one rural locality in the Mari El Republic bears this name:
Pochinok, Mari El Republic, a village in Gornoshumetsky Rural Okrug of Yurinsky District;

Nizhny Novgorod Oblast
As of 2012, four rural localities in Nizhny Novgorod Oblast bear this name:
Pochinok, Chkalovsky District, Nizhny Novgorod Oblast, a village in Solomatovsky Selsoviet of Chkalovsky District; 
Pochinok, Chernyshikhinsky Selsoviet, Kstovsky District, Nizhny Novgorod Oblast, a village in Chernyshikhinsky Selsoviet of Kstovsky District; 
Pochinok, Novolikeyevsky Selsoviet, Kstovsky District, Nizhny Novgorod Oblast, a village in Novolikeyevsky Selsoviet of Kstovsky District; 
Pochinok, Sokolsky District, Nizhny Novgorod Oblast, a village in Volzhsky Selsoviet of Sokolsky District;

Novgorod Oblast
As of 2012, one rural locality in Novgorod Oblast bears this name:
Pochinok, Novgorod Oblast, a village in Yamnikskoye Settlement of Demyansky District

Smolensk Oblast
As of 2012, eight inhabited localities in Smolensk Oblast bear this name:

Urban localities
Pochinok, Pochinkovsky District, Smolensk Oblast, a town under the administrative jurisdiction of Pochinkovskoye Urban Settlement in Pochinkovsky District

Rural localities
Pochinok, Dorogobuzhsky District, Smolensk Oblast, a village in Aleksinskoye Rural Settlement of Dorogobuzhsky District
Pochinok, Beresnevskoye Rural Settlement, Dukhovshchinsky District, Smolensk Oblast, a village in Beresnevskoye Rural Settlement of Dukhovshchinsky District
Pochinok, Beresnevskoye Rural Settlement, Dukhovshchinsky District, Smolensk Oblast, a village in Beresnevskoye Rural Settlement of Dukhovshchinsky District
Pochinok, Dobrinskoye Rural Settlement, Dukhovshchinsky District, Smolensk Oblast, a village in Dobrinskoye Rural Settlement of Dukhovshchinsky District
Pochinok, Tretyakovskoye Rural Settlement, Dukhovshchinsky District, Smolensk Oblast, a village in Tretyakovskoye Rural Settlement of Dukhovshchinsky District
Pochinok, Kardymovsky District, Smolensk Oblast, a village in Netrizovskoye Rural Settlement of Kardymovsky District
Pochinok, Rudnyansky District, Smolensk Oblast, a village in Ponizovskoye Rural Settlement of Rudnyansky District

Sverdlovsk Oblast
As of 2012, one rural locality in Sverdlovsk Oblast bears this name:
Pochinok, Sverdlovsk Oblast, a village in Taraskovsky Selsoviet under the administrative jurisdiction of the closed administrative-territorial formation of Novouralsk

Tver Oblast
As of 2012, eleven rural localities in Tver Oblast bear this name:
Pochinok, Filippkovskoye Rural Settlement, Bezhetsky District, Tver Oblast, a village in Filippkovskoye Rural Settlement of Bezhetsky District
Pochinok, Zhitishchenskoye Rural Settlement, Bezhetsky District, Tver Oblast, a village in Zhitishchenskoye Rural Settlement of Bezhetsky District
Pochinok, Firovsky District, Tver Oblast, a village in Velikooktyabrskoye Rural Settlement of Firovsky District
Pochinok, Krasnokholmsky District, Tver Oblast, a village in Barbinskoye Rural Settlement of Krasnokholmsky District
Pochinok, Maksatikhinsky District, Tver Oblast, a village in Malyshevskoye Rural Settlement of Maksatikhinsky District
Pochinok, Penovsky District, Tver Oblast, a village in Zayevskoye Rural Settlement of Penovsky District
Pochinok, Selizharovsky District, Tver Oblast, a village in Selishchenskoye Rural Settlement of Selizharovsky District
Pochinok, Knyashchinskoye Rural Settlement, Vyshnevolotsky District, Tver Oblast, a village in Knyashchinskoye Rural Settlement of Vyshnevolotsky District
Pochinok, Ovsishchenskoye Rural Settlement, Vyshnevolotsky District, Tver Oblast, a village in Ovsishchenskoye Rural Settlement of Vyshnevolotsky District
Pochinok, Sorokinskoye Rural Settlement, Vyshnevolotsky District, Tver Oblast, a village in Sorokinskoye Rural Settlement of Vyshnevolotsky District
Pochinok, Zapadnodvinsky District, Tver Oblast, a village in Ilyinskoye Rural Settlement of Zapadnodvinsky District

Vologda Oblast
As of 2012, thirty rural localities in Vologda Oblast bear this name:
Pochinok, Fetininsky Selsoviet, Babushkinsky District, Vologda Oblast, a village in Fetininsky Selsoviet of Babushkinsky District
Pochinok, Kosikovsky Selsoviet, Babushkinsky District, Vologda Oblast, a village in Kosikovsky Selsoviet of Babushkinsky District
Pochinok, Domozerovsky Selsoviet, Cherepovetsky District, Vologda Oblast, a village in Domozerovsky Selsoviet of Cherepovetsky District
Pochinok, Korotovsky Selsoviet, Cherepovetsky District, Vologda Oblast, a village in Korotovsky Selsoviet of Cherepovetsky District
Pochinok, Yaganovsky Selsoviet, Cherepovetsky District, Vologda Oblast, a village in Yaganovsky Selsoviet of Cherepovetsky District
Pochinok, Anokhinsky Selsoviet, Gryazovetsky District, Vologda Oblast, a village in Anokhinsky Selsoviet of Gryazovetsky District
Pochinok, Frolovsky Selsoviet, Gryazovetsky District, Vologda Oblast, a village in Frolovsky Selsoviet of Gryazovetsky District
Pochinok, Ploskovsky Selsoviet, Gryazovetsky District, Vologda Oblast, a village in Ploskovsky Selsoviet of Gryazovetsky District
Pochinok, Ploskovsky Selsoviet, Gryazovetsky District, Vologda Oblast, a village in Ploskovsky Selsoviet of Gryazovetsky District
Pochinok, Yurovsky Selsoviet, Gryazovetsky District, Vologda Oblast, a village in Yurovsky Selsoviet of Gryazovetsky District
Pochinok, Kaduysky District, Vologda Oblast, a village in Velikoselsky Selsoviet of Kaduysky District
Pochinok, Ilyinsky Selsoviet, Kharovsky District, Vologda Oblast, a village in Ilyinsky Selsoviet of Kharovsky District
Pochinok, Kharovsky Selsoviet, Kharovsky District, Vologda Oblast, a village in Kharovsky Selsoviet of Kharovsky District
Pochinok, Kubinsky Selsoviet, Kharovsky District, Vologda Oblast, a village in Kubinsky Selsoviet of Kharovsky District
Pochinok, Kirillovsky District, Vologda Oblast, a village in Kolkachsky Selsoviet of Kirillovsky District
Pochinok, Staroselsky Selsoviet, Mezhdurechensky District, Vologda Oblast, a village in Staroselsky Selsoviet of Mezhdurechensky District
Pochinok, Sukhonsky Selsoviet, Mezhdurechensky District, Vologda Oblast, a village in Sukhonsky Selsoviet of Mezhdurechensky District
Pochinok, Sizemsky Selsoviet, Sheksninsky District, Vologda Oblast, a village in Sizemsky Selsoviet of Sheksninsky District
Pochinok, Yeremeyevsky Selsoviet, Sheksninsky District, Vologda Oblast, a village in Yeremeyevsky Selsoviet of Sheksninsky District
Pochinok, Zheleznodorozhny Selsoviet, Sheksninsky District, Vologda Oblast, a village in Zheleznodorozhny Selsoviet of Sheksninsky District
Pochinok, Borovetsky Selsoviet, Sokolsky District, Vologda Oblast, a village in Borovetsky Selsoviet of Sokolsky District
Pochinok, Kokoshilovsky Selsoviet, Sokolsky District, Vologda Oblast, a village in Kokoshilovsky Selsoviet of Sokolsky District
Pochinok, Bogorodsky Selsoviet, Ust-Kubinsky District, Vologda Oblast, a village in Bogorodsky Selsoviet of Ust-Kubinsky District
Pochinok, Tomashsky Selsoviet, Ust-Kubinsky District, Vologda Oblast, a village in Tomashsky Selsoviet of Ust-Kubinsky District
Pochinok, Kipelovsky Selsoviet, Vologodsky District, Vologda Oblast, a village in Kipelovsky Selsoviet of Vologodsky District
Pochinok, Leskovsky Selsoviet, Vologodsky District, Vologda Oblast, a village in Leskovsky Selsoviet of Vologodsky District
Pochinok, Raboche-Krestyansky Selsoviet, Vologodsky District, Vologda Oblast, a village in Raboche-Krestyansky Selsoviet of Vologodsky District
Pochinok, Spassky Selsoviet, Vologodsky District, Vologda Oblast, a village in Spassky Selsoviet of Vologodsky District
Pochinok, Staroselsky Selsoviet, Vologodsky District, Vologda Oblast, a village in Staroselsky Selsoviet of Vologodsky District
Pochinok, Veprevsky Selsoviet, Vologodsky District, Vologda Oblast, a village in Veprevsky Selsoviet of Vologodsky District

Yaroslavl Oblast
As of 2012, twenty-six rural localities in Yaroslavl Oblast bear this name:
Pochinok, Babayevsky Rural Okrug, Danilovsky District, Yaroslavl Oblast, a village in Babayevsky Rural Okrug of Danilovsky District
Pochinok, Semlovsky Rural Okrug, Danilovsky District, Yaroslavl Oblast, a village in Semlovsky Rural Okrug of Danilovsky District
Pochinok, Seredskoy Rural Okrug, Danilovsky District, Yaroslavl Oblast, a village in Seredskoy Rural Okrug of Danilovsky District
Pochinok, Trofimovsky Rural Okrug, Danilovsky District, Yaroslavl Oblast, a village in Trofimovsky Rural Okrug of Danilovsky District
Pochinok, Osetsky Rural Okrug, Lyubimsky District, Yaroslavl Oblast, a village in Osetsky Rural Okrug of Lyubimsky District
Pochinok, Voskresensky Rural Okrug, Lyubimsky District, Yaroslavl Oblast, a village in Voskresensky Rural Okrug of Lyubimsky District
Pochinok, Yermakovsky Rural Okrug, Lyubimsky District, Yaroslavl Oblast, a village in Yermakovsky Rural Okrug of Lyubimsky District
Pochinok, Kryukovsky Rural Okrug, Myshkinsky District, Yaroslavl Oblast, a village in Kryukovsky Rural Okrug of Myshkinsky District
Pochinok, Zarubinsky Rural Okrug, Myshkinsky District, Yaroslavl Oblast, a village in Zarubinsky Rural Okrug of Myshkinsky District
Pochinok, Kukoboysky Rural Okrug, Pervomaysky District, Yaroslavl Oblast, a village in Kukoboysky Rural Okrug of Pervomaysky District
Pochinok, Nikologorsky Rural Okrug, Pervomaysky District, Yaroslavl Oblast, a village in Nikologorsky Rural Okrug of Pervomaysky District
Pochinok, Kladovsky Rural Okrug, Poshekhonsky District, Yaroslavl Oblast, a village in Kladovsky Rural Okrug of Poshekhonsky District
Pochinok, Priukhrinsky Rural Okrug, Poshekhonsky District, Yaroslavl Oblast, a village in Priukhrinsky Rural Okrug of Poshekhonsky District
Pochinok, Yudinsky Rural Okrug, Poshekhonsky District, Yaroslavl Oblast, a village in Yudinsky Rural Okrug of Poshekhonsky District
Pochinok, Arefinsky Rural Okrug, Rybinsky District, Yaroslavl Oblast, a village in Arefinsky Rural Okrug of Rybinsky District
Pochinok, Glebovsky Rural Okrug, Rybinsky District, Yaroslavl Oblast, a village in Glebovsky Rural Okrug of Rybinsky District
Pochinok, Glebovsky Rural Okrug, Rybinsky District, Yaroslavl Oblast, a village in Glebovsky Rural Okrug of Rybinsky District
Pochinok, Kamennikovsky Rural Okrug, Rybinsky District, Yaroslavl Oblast, a village in Kamennikovsky Rural Okrug of Rybinsky District
Pochinok, Makarovsky Rural Okrug, Rybinsky District, Yaroslavl Oblast, a village in Makarovsky Rural Okrug of Rybinsky District
Pochinok, Mikhaylovsky Rural Okrug, Rybinsky District, Yaroslavl Oblast, a village in Mikhaylovsky Rural Okrug of Rybinsky District
Pochinok, Pogorelsky Rural Okrug, Rybinsky District, Yaroslavl Oblast, a village in Pogorelsky Rural Okrug of Rybinsky District
Pochinok, Shashkovsky Rural Okrug, Rybinsky District, Yaroslavl Oblast, a village in Shashkovsky Rural Okrug of Rybinsky District
Pochinok, Metenininsky Rural Okrug, Tutayevsky District, Yaroslavl Oblast, a village in Metenininsky Rural Okrug of Tutayevsky District
Pochinok, Nikolsky Rural Okrug, Tutayevsky District, Yaroslavl Oblast, a village in Nikolsky Rural Okrug of Tutayevsky District
Pochinok, Velikoselsky Rural Okrug, Tutayevsky District, Yaroslavl Oblast, a village in Velikoselsky Rural Okrug of Tutayevsky District
Pochinok, Yaroslavsky District, Yaroslavl Oblast, a village in Tolbukhinsky Rural Okrug of Yaroslavsky District

Renamed localities
Pochinok, name of Konyginsky Pochinok, a village in Tsentralnoye Settlement of Buysky District in Kostroma Oblast, before December 2009; 
Pochinok, name of Kurilovsky Pochinok, a village in Tsentralnoye Settlement of Buysky District in Kostroma Oblast, before December 2009; 
Pochinok, name of Kaplinsky Pochinok, a village in Tsentralnoye Settlement of Buysky District in Kostroma Oblast, before December 2009; 
Pochinok, name of Borovsky Pochinok, a village in Tsentralnoye Settlement of Buysky District in Kostroma Oblast, before December 2009;

Alternative names
Pochinok, alternative name of Bolshoy Pochinok, a village in Kortsovskoye Settlement of Soligalichsky District in Kostroma Oblast; 
Pochinok, alternative name of Sokolovsky Pochinok, a village in Bolsherogachevskoye Rural Settlement of Dmitrovsky District in Moscow Oblast; 
Pochinok, alternative name of Pochinki, a village in Skorobogatovsky Selsoviet of Koverninsky District in Nizhny Novgorod Oblast;